Steve Saylor is a Canadian based game and media critic, host of Blind Gamer with Steve Saylor, and consultant that looks at accessibility within gaming. He is known for his YouTube and Twitch channel, along with having worked on the accessibility aspects of games such as The Last of Us Part II, Assassin's Creed Valhalla and Watch Dogs: Legion.

In Media 
Steve Saylor has appeared in numerous publications, including Kinda Funny, and has been covered in Vice Media, CG Magazine, MobileSyrup, and CNN, and has written articles for IGN. He is also an Accessibility Advocate that has spoken at GAconf, and was nominated for the 2021 Canadian Game Awards.

References

Living people
Year of birth missing (living people)
Gaming YouTubers
Twitch (service) streamers
Game accessibility